Armina babai is a species of sea slug, a nudibranch, a marine gastropod mollusk in the family Arminidae.

Description
Armina babai grows to 50 mm in length and appears flattened, elongated, and narrow posteriorly. It has a yellow sole and smooth mantle. Longitudinal ridges are absent, as is other ornamentation. The body itself appears ashy to whitish grey and is translucent. There are two big spots on the notum that are purplish. The head veil is an ashy colour and has papillae that are dark brown. The anterior gills are yellowish white while the posterior gills appear dark purple. The viscera are pinkish in colour which sometimes show through the body. In some specimens, there are yellowish brown smudges that can be seen around the edge of the mantle.

Distribution
This species is found in the waters of Pakistan, India, China, and Japan.

Behaviour
Armina babai may emit a potent medicinal odor when handled.

References

External links
Images

Arminidae
Gastropods described in 1934